Borough High Street is a road in Southwark, London, running south-west from London Bridge, forming part of the A3 route which runs from London to Portsmouth, on the south coast of England.

Overview 
Borough High Street continues southwest as Newington Causeway, here co-inciding with ancient Stane Street, the Roman road between London and Chichester. Another important connection is with the Dover Road (the modern A2 route) which diverges in a south-east direction from Borough High Street at a junction of five roads adjacent to Borough Underground station as Great Dover Street. The Dover Road mostly follows the alignment of Roman Watling Street, though, here, the original Roman route was along Tabard Street closely parallel with Great Dover Street to the north.

The stretch of Borough High Street south of the junction with Long Lane, Marshalsea Road, and Tabard Street, where stands the ancient church of St. George the Martyr, was formerly called Blackman Street after a long resident family there.
 
Borough Market was once held on the street, but has been moved to the west with its main entrance on Southwark Street. Southwark Cathedral, prominent on the west side of the street near London Bridge, can be reached by a small pedestrian bridge and stairs, though its postal address is actually Montague Close.

The earliest recorded name for the street is simply 'The Borough' which was the part between the fork of the street and London Bridge. South of the fork it was called 'St. Margaret's Hill'. These names were subsumed in the Tudor period as 'Longe Southwark' (differentiated from 'Short Southwark' now Tooley Street) and by the late Georgian era as simply 'High Street' and the northern section from the junction with Duke Street Hill was renamed 'Wellington Street' to commemorate the Duke of Wellington. From the 1890s the London County Council started to rationalise all metropolitan street names and 'Borough High Street' became the name for the current route.

History

Before the building of Westminster Bridge, Borough High Street was the only connection from the south bank of the Thames to London, which lay on the north bank. As a major communications node for traffic between London and Portsmouth, Dover, south-east England generally and also travellers from Europe, Borough High Street had many coaching inns. These were of considerable size, with courtyard and surrounding multi-tier galleries. There were twenty-three in total, including the Bear, the Queen's Head, the King's Head, the Catherine Wheel, the Tabard, the White Hart, and the George. Many of them dated back originally to the mediæval period, and were in use as coaching inns up to the mid-nineteenth century, when this mode of transport was superseded by the railway. These inns were very famous and receive mention in the work of such literary giants as Chaucer, Shakespeare and Charles Dickens, though are now all gone - apart from the George. 
 
On the west side of the street, the modern office block called Brandon House at 180 Borough High Street (opposite Borough Underground station) marks the site of a mansion called Suffolk Place, demolished in 1557. It is depicted by Anthony van den Wyngaerde's sixteenth century Panorama of London, which features Borough High Street prominently in the foreground of the picture. After demolition the site of the mansion and the area to the west of Borough High Street here became notorious as the criminal enclave of The Mint.

The Marshalsea and King's Bench Prisons were also located on Borough High Street on the east side between Newcomen Street and Tabard Street.

Street numbering

The present numbering of the buildings on the street is confusing because of piecemeal alteration over the past 150 years:- The street was widened and realigned to the west in the 1820s for the Rennie London Bridge. The 'fork' at the junction with Southwark Street was created when that street was inserted, in 1864, to connect the London Bridge, Southwark Bridge, and Blackfriars Bridge routes together. This new route cut across Stoney Street and isolated its southern end, which section was subsequently renumbered as part of Borough High Street although it actually lies behind numbers 28–32 to their west-side. The small alleyway connecting the two branches of the 'fork' is named 'Counter Court' (see Borough Compter) but is not an address for any premises.

The railway viaduct across the street was also erected in 1864 and this cut across a quadrant of both the main streets. This led to the numbering on the west-side of the street ceasing at the junction with Bedale Street, at which the Southwark Street numbers begin as number '6'. However, these appear continuous with Borough High Street which only becomes apparent at the junction with Stoney Street further along to the west. Between Bedale Street and No 28 there is no 'west-side' of the High Street as this is Southwark Street 'west-side'. The High Street's numbers continue at No 28, the HSBC Bank branch, which also seems to be on the south-side of Southwark Street, but that street's south-side numbers do not start until after the junction with the 'fork' going west.

To compound the eccentric numbering, the building that appears first at the northwest side of Borough High Street (Hibernia Chambers/Glaziers Hall No 9 Montague Close at its ground floor) had its first floor level connected to the Bridge level pavement in 2000 and was given the address 'No 2 London Bridge'. On the northwest side, the street numbers of the High Street start after the small bridge crossing over Tooley Street as No 4 Borough High Street 'Bridge House'.

With the extension of the railway viaduct in 2010 the buildings between it and the junction with Bedale Street an attempt was made to simplify the numbering  system. The Victorian buildings were replaced in 2013 but this is a glazed 'foyer' facility of Borough Market and is not actually numbered as premises but the section which is a store has been provided with the number '16' which means that the foyer could be numbered 18 and 20. This means the numbering is now 4, 6 - 8, 10 actually accessed as a side stairway of 6-8 (gap stairs down to Cathedral and Borough Market) 14 (vault unit within the viaduct) 16 and (Southwark Street junction) 28. 

Continuing along the 'east side' of the 'fork' along the main part of the street is numbered 30, 32, 34. Then returning to the 'west side' of the 'fork', is numbered 36 (this is north of 34 and adjacent to 28) continuing south as 38 to 42. The building immediately next to 28 (i.e. south of Counter Court), north of the side door of 34, opposite 36  and behind 30 (to its east) is numbered '1b Southwark Street', presumably the side door of 28 is taken as '1 Southwark Street' although not numbered as such; it is therefore actually in the High Street. Southwark Street continues properly at the junction with the 'west side' of the 'fork' as No 3 Southwark Street, but this number appears on its side door situated next to 36 and so is also in the west fork of the High Street.

Amenities and features

Borough is a cosmopolitan area of London, with many restaurants, bars and Borough Market. The street also has many cafés and food shops including Sainsbury's Local. Public Houses include:
North to south - 
 The Barrowboy and Banker (previously a NatWest Bank branch)
 The George Inn
 The Bridge Ta (previously a The Slug and Lettuce and occupying the Town Hall Chambers building which was previous to 1989 a NatWest Bank branch)
 St Christopher's Inn
 Belushi's
 The Roxy Bar & Screen
 The Blue Eyed Maid
 The Trinity
 The Ship

The Post Office (dated 1913) opposite Borough tube station closed in 2008. The main Post Office at the northern end of the street originated as the Women's Ward of the 1852 development of St Thomas's Hospital. When London Bridge Station services were extended by a viaduct to Charing Cross Station in 1868 the Hospital relocated and was partly demolished. This building remains as having been used as a goods office for the railway company.

David Bomberg House
David Bomberg House is a hall of residence at 282–302 Borough High Street for London South Bank University students. The building comprises 289 single en-suite bedrooms, divided into five blocks. It is close to the Borough Underground station and the main campus of London South Bank University on Borough Road north of Elephant and Castle.

The building is named after the English painter David Bomberg (1890–1957), who was a teacher at London South Bank University when it was known as Borough Polytechnic. He was the leading artist of the Borough Group during the 1940s and 1950s. A portrait of him hangs in the reception area. David Bomberg is considered to be London South Bank University's most famous teacher. In 2009, it was announced that the University had received a gift of a collection of works by Bomberg.

In 2009, a late night licence was granted for premises on the ground floor (Costcutter), despite a significant number of objections from residents. In February 2011, the Chaze bar and restaurant on the ground floor of the building in the former Costcutter space, opposite Southwark Police Station, obtained planning permission after a four-month deferral, despite opposition by the building's owner, London South Bank University.

Adjoining roads 

From South to North on east-side:
 Newington Causeway
 Harper Road
 King's Place
 Trinity Street
 Hulme Place
 Avon Place
 Great Dover Street
 Long Lane
 Tabard Street
 Angel Place
 Layton's Buildings
 Chapel Court
 Mermaid Court
 Newcomen Street
 Kentish Buildings
 Queen's Head Yard
 Talbot Yard
 George Inn Yard
 White Hart Yard
 King's Head Yard
 St Thomas's Street
 London Bridge Street
 Guildable Manor Street
 Railway Approach
 Duke Street Hill
 Tooley Street
 London Bridge

From North to South on west-side:-
 Montague Close
 Green Dragon Court
 Bedale Street
 Stoney Street
 Southwark Street
 Counter Court
 Calvert's Buildings
 St Margaret's Court
 Maidstone Buildings
 * Union Street
 Little Dorrit Court
 Marshalsea Road
 Lant Street
 Great Suffolk Street
 Borough Road

Transport connections 
 London Bridge Station entrance and ticket hall of Jubilee line
 Borough Underground station
Quietway 1 cycle route crosses Borough High Street on Great Suffolk Street/Trinity Street.

References

External links 
 Borough High Street, Borough, c. 1926

Streets in the London Borough of Southwark
Shopping streets in London